The Prisoner of Second Avenue is a 1975 American black comedy film written by Neil Simon, directed and produced by Melvin Frank and starring Jack Lemmon and Anne Bancroft. Neil Simon adapted the screenplay from his 1971 Broadway play.

Plot
The story revolves around the escalating problems of a middle-aged couple living on Second Avenue on the Upper East Side of Manhattan, New York City.  Mel Edison has just lost his job after 22 years of faithful service, and now has to cope with being unemployed at middle age during an economic recession. The action occurs during an intense summer heat wave and a prolonged garbage strike, which exacerbates Edison's plight as he and his wife Edna deal with noisy and argumentative neighbors, loud sounds emanating from Manhattan streets up to their apartment, and even a broad-daylight burglary of their apartment. Mel can't find a job, so Edna goes back to work. Mel eventually suffers a nervous breakdown, and it is up to the loving care of his brother Harry, his sisters, and, mostly, Edna, to try to restore him to a new reality.

Cast

 Jack Lemmon as Mel Edison
 Anne Bancroft as Edna Edison
 Gene Saks as Harry Edison
 Elizabeth Wilson as Pauline
 Florence Stanley as Pearl
 Maxine Stuart as Belle
 Sylvester Stallone as Youth in Park
 F. Murray Abraham as Taxi Driver
 John Ritter as Elevator Passenger (uncredited) 
 Joe Turkel as Man Upstairs (uncredited)

Production

Development and writing
The Prisoner of Second Avenue premiered on Broadway at the Eugene O'Neill Theatre on November 11, 1971 and closed on September 29, 1973 after 798 performances and four previews. Produced by Saint Subber and directed by Mike Nichols, the play starred Peter Falk and Lee Grant as Mel and Edna Edison and Vincent Gardenia as Mel's brother Harry.

The production received 1972 Tony Award nominations for Best Play, for Mike Nichols for Best Director, Play, and Vincent Gardenia for Supporting Actor, Play.

Clive Barnes, in The New York Times, wrote that "it is, I think, the most honestly amusing comedy that Mr. Simon has so far given us." Walter Kerr, in The New York Times wrote: "He [Simon] has made a magnificent effort to part company with the mechanical, and his over-all success stands as handsome proof that humor and honesty can be got into bed together."
 
The play ran in the West End at the Vaudeville Theatre, produced by Old Vic Company/Old Vic Productions and Sonia Friedman Productions, opening on June 30, 2010 in previews. Directed by Terry Johnson, the cast starred Jeff Goldblum and Mercedes Ruehl. This marked Ruehl's London stage debut.

The film version of The Prisoner of Second Avenue stars Jack Lemmon, Anne Bancroft and Gene Saks.  It was produced and directed by Melvin Frank from a screenplay by Simon.  The music is by Marvin Hamlisch. Sylvester Stallone appears in a brief role as a suspected mugger of Jack Lemmon's character.

Reception

Critical response
A. H. Weiler of The New York Times wrote that if the film "is less than an overpowering study of a married couple driven to distraction by the irritations and indignities of local middle-class living, it still scores valid points, both serious and funny ... Mr. Simon is serious about a theme that isn't earth-shaking and he understandably cloaks its gravity with genuine chuckles that pop up mostly as radio news bulletins such as the flash that a Polish freighter has just run into the Statue of Liberty. And, with a cast whose members appreciate what they're saying and doing, the gnawing problems of 'Second Avenue' become a pleasure." Arthur D. Murphy of Variety wrote, "The film is more of a drama with comedy, for the personal problems as well as the environmental challenges aren't really funny, and even some of the humor is forced and strident ... maybe there have been too many films on the trials of urban existence to make yet another parade of big city woes laughable." Gene Siskel of the Chicago Tribune gave the film one-and-a-half stars out of four and stated that "knocking the problems of living in New York City is no longer funny. It's become an old joke." Charles Champlin of the Los Angeles Times wrote that "in Simon's tussles to make jokes, make truth and make jokes about some bitter truths, the outcome is curious, uneven, tense and involving. 'Prisoner' is most impressive when it is least funny; the laughter comes out of a painful craziness." Gary Arnold of The Washington Post panned the film as a "monotonous, static, self-righteous gripe comedy ... [Simon] ends up patronizing his characters instead of understanding what drives and ails them." Paul D. Zimmerman of Newsweek described the film as "Simon at his least, if only because Mel and Edna are not characters, only playthings of urban havoc." Pauline Kael of The New Yorker disparaged the film "a big-screen sitcom," adding, "Neil Simon tells us exactly what each person is thinking, and each line cancels out the one before. This is bad enough on the stage, but on the screen it's intolerable."

References

External links
 The Prisoner of Second Avenue (play) at the Internet Broadway Database
 
 
 
 
 

1971 plays
Broadway plays
American plays adapted into films
Plays by Neil Simon
Plays set in New York City
1975 films
1975 comedy-drama films
American black comedy films
American comedy-drama films
1970s English-language films
Films scored by Marvin Hamlisch
American films based on plays
Films based on works by Neil Simon
Films directed by Melvin Frank
Films set in New York City
Films shot in New York City
Films with screenplays by Neil Simon
Warner Bros. films
1975 comedy films
1975 drama films
1970s American films